Gadow may refer to:
People
Hans Friedrich Gadow, German ornithologist
Places
Gadów, Greater Poland Voivodeship, Poland
Gądów, Lower Silesian Voivodeship, Poland